John Flaherty (21 September 1908 – 10 May 1980) was a British gymnast. He competed in eight events at the 1948 Summer Olympics.

References

1908 births
1980 deaths
British male artistic gymnasts
Olympic gymnasts of Great Britain
Gymnasts at the 1948 Summer Olympics
Place of birth missing
20th-century British people